Diastole tenuistriata is a species of air-breathing land snails or semi-slugs, terrestrial pulmonate gastropod mollusks in the family Helicarionidae. This species is endemic to the Pitcairn Islands, a British territory in the southern Pacific Ocean.

References

T
Fauna of the Pitcairn Islands
Molluscs of Oceania
Vulnerable fauna of Oceania
Gastropods described in 1995
Taxonomy articles created by Polbot